Charles Ramsay may refer to:

Charles Aloysius Ramsay (fl. 1677–1680), Scottish-Prussian writer on stenography
Charles Maule Ramsay (1859–1936), British Army officer and politician
Charles Ramsay (stuntman), British stuntman
Charles Ramsay (British Army officer, born 1936) (1936–2017), British Army officer
Charles Ramsay, 7th Earl of Dalhousie (died 1764), Earl of Dalhousie
Charles Ramsay (ice hockey), in the French Ice Hockey Hall of Fame
Sir Charles Ramsay, 3rd Baronet (died 1695) of the Ramsay baronets

See also

Charles Ramsey (disambiguation)